Kinh Môn is a town of Hải Dương Province in the Red River Delta region of Vietnam. As of 2003 the district had a population of 164,956. The district covers an area of 163 km². The district capital lies at An Lưu.

References

Districts of Hải Dương province
County-level towns in Vietnam